Kondanagula is a village in Mahbubnagar district, India.

Villages in Mahbubnagar district